Heather Suttie is a Scottish TV & radio presenter and writer.

She presented BBC Children's Saturday morning show Live & Kicking and was the first female anchor of a breakfast show on commercial radio with Beat 106 in Scotland. 

She regularly writes articles on travel, personal issues, environmentalism, plastic bags, recycled fashion and lifestyle pieces.

Career
Suttie hosted children's science programme Hyperlinks and was one of four hosts on ITV2's youth entertainment show when the channel launched Bedrock in 1998, beating 767 other hopefuls to the role.

She also appeared as a reviewer on Channel 4's MovieWatch from 1994 to 1997.

Her first presenting role aged 20 was a BBC Scotland music show the Beat Room. In 1997 she hosted a weekly music format show broadcast online from London for the Mean Fiddler Group. Starting in 2000 she co-hosted T in the Park TV for ten years, broadcasting live from the festival. She has also worked as a music presenter with Done and Dusted at every UK music festival and in Europe with MTV.
On radio, she hosted Beat 106's Breakfast Show and drivetime shows from 2001 to 2005. From 2005 to 2008 she presented the drivetime slot on Xfm Scotland along with stints on the Cooperative In-store Radio Network.
From 2014 to 2016 she hosted a BBC Radio Scotland series The Day I Changed My Life and guest slots on several shows.
Suttie has more than 10,000 hours of live TV experience, including work for Princess Productions, Done & Dusted, Blink TV, ITV2, BBC1, BBC2 and STV.

An eco campaigner (ecomunky and Say No To Plastic), Suttie worked on projects with The Daily Record, Aimee McWilliams and Oran Mor, hosting vintage and eco sales from 2007 to 2011. She wrote more than 40 articles for press. She has appeared on The Today programme and Jeremy Vine on BBC4 and BBC2. She has been commended by the Scottish Government on her ideas on reducing plastic bag waste and being instrumental in the introduction of the 5p plastic bag charge in Scotland.

Voice-over work includes Tesco in-store radio, monster.co.uk, Clairol, Irn Bru and other radio advertisers.

She has hosted event awards including the CIS Excellence Awards (2003–2009), The Evening Times, Property Executive Awards (2007–2009 in Glasgow and Manchester), and a number of events for The Herald newspaper.

Suttie wrote a weekly clubs column for The Evening Times from 2006 to 2010 and a weekly social diary column for The Sunday Post from 1999 to 2009. In 2018 she started writing a regular book column in the Scottish Daily Record.

She spent a year in Tanzania in 2011 working voluntarily with the Chief Buddhist Monk of the African continent and wrote a blog on her experiences.

References

https://www.heraldscotland.com/opinion/20045494.agenda-must-ban-single-use-plastic-wipes/

https://www.dailyrecord.co.uk/lifestyle/things-to-do/bookclub-guru-heather-suttie-books-27151123.amp

Living people
1973 births
Scottish radio presenters
Scottish women radio presenters
https://www.scotsman.com/arts-and-culture/film-and-tv/former-scots-broadcaster-wants-end-plastic-pollution-contact-lenses-1406420

https://www.glasgowlive.co.uk/news/glasgow-news/people-urged-not-drop-discarded-18335200

https://www.dailyrecord.co.uk/lifestyle/health-fitness/97-per-cent-contact-lens-20317271

https://www.dailyrecord.co.uk/lifestyle/food-drink/what-ive-learned-three-years-4468727

https://www.dailyrecord.co.uk/entertainment/celebrity/dj-heather-sutties-relief-as-she-recovers-1088435
21st-century Scottish women